Piz Palü is a mountain in the Bernina Range of the Alps, located between Switzerland and Italy. It is a large glaciated massif composed of three main summits, on a ridge running from west to east. The main (and central) summit is 3,900 metres high and is located within the Swiss canton of Graubünden, although the border with the Italian region of Lombardy runs about 100 metres west of it at almost the same height (3,898 m). The western summit (3,823 m; on the international border) is named Piz Spinas and is the only one not covered by ice. The eastern summit (3,882 m; within Switzerland) is named Piz Palü Orientale. The name Palü derives from the Latin palus, meaning a swamp, and the mountain is said to be named after the Alpe Palü, a high alpine pasture some 4 km to its east.

Climbing history
As early as 12 August 1835, the 3,882 m east peak was climbed by Oswald Heer, and Peter and M. Flury, with guides Johann Madutz and Gian Marchet Colani (the 'chamois king of the  Bernina'), who were under the impression that this was the highest summit of the mountain. This is still the normal route from Switzerland, be it followed by an easy traverse to the central peak. A second ascent of the east summit was made on 24 July 1864 by Edward N. Buxton, W.F. Digby, William Edward Hall, J. Johnston, and Montagu Woodmass with the Pontresina guides Peter Jenny, Alexander Flury, and J. B. Walther. This group was unaware of the ascent almost 30 years earlier and also believed to have reached the highest summit (they had no vision on the summit). Approaching from the Italian (south) side, four weeks later (17 August 1864) D. W. Freshfield, J. D. Walker and R. M. Beachcroft with the guide François Devouassoud climbed the pass between the central and east summits, but chose to climb the latter peak again.

It is uncertain when the central and highest peak (sometimes distinguished by the name Muot da Palü) was first reached. Robin Collomb believes that this was in 1866 by Kenelm Edward Digby with the before mentioned guide Peter Jenny and a porter. It was certainly ascended on 28 June 1868 by A. W. Moore, Horace Walker and Jakob Anderegg. Just four weeks later a traverse of all three peaks was made by Herren Albert Wachler, Wallner, and George, with the guides Hans and Christian Grass on 22 July 1868.

The mountain has gained some prominence from the film The White Hell of Pitz Palu (1929), co-directed by mountain-film pioneer Arnold Fanck and Georg Wilhelm Pabst, and starring a young Leni Riefenstahl.

Panorama

References

External links 

 Piz Palü on SummitPost
 Piz Palü on Hikr

Bernina Range
Mountains of Graubünden
Mountains of Lombardy
Engadin
Mountains of the Alps
Alpine three-thousanders
Italy–Switzerland border
International mountains of Europe
Mountains of Switzerland
Three-thousanders of Switzerland
Poschiavo
Pontresina